Topolnica is a village in the municipality of Radoviš, North Macedonia.

Demographics
According to the 2002 census, the village had a total of 562 inhabitants. Ethnic groups in the village include:
 Macedonians 55
 Turks 499
 Albanians 7
 Others 1

References

Villages in Radoviš Municipality
Turkish communities in North Macedonia